The Quadling Country is the southern division of L. Frank Baum's fictional Land of Oz, first introduced in The Wonderful Wizard of Oz (1900). It is distinguished by the color red, worn by most of the local inhabitants called the Quadlings as well as the color of their surroundings. Like the Munchkin Country, the outer regions of the Quadling Country are rich, pleasant and lovely, being inhabited by kind and friendly people, while the areas closer to the Emerald City (most of the regions between the mountains of the Hammer-Heads, the enclave of Dainty China Country and the Forest of the Fighting Trees) are forbidding and dangerous.

Locations and inhabitants
Like all the countries of Oz, the Quadling Country contains various unusual sights, creatures, and places. Among them are:

The Wonderful Wizard of Oz
 The Palace of Glinda - A palace that is home to Glinda (also known in The Wonderful Wizard of Oz and other Oz books as the Good Witch of the South).
 The Forest of the Fighting Trees - A forest whose northern row of sentient trees have the power to use their branches to fling away anyone who attempts to enter the forest.
 The Dainty China Country - An area where all of its people and buildings are made of china.
 Mountain of the Hammer-Heads - The hills in which dwell the belligerent and armless Hammer-Heads
 Unnamed Forest - A forest whose animals hail the Cowardly Lion as their king after he had defeated a giant spider that terrorized the forest.

The Emerald City of Oz
 Miss Cuttenclip - A little girl who cuts paper dolls from live paper called Cuttenclips. The Cuttenclips live in Cuttenclip Village which has walls surrounding it to keep the winds from blowing the Cuttenclips away.
 Fuddlecumjig - A village that is home to the Fuddles (who are made from puzzle pieces and have to be reassembled often).
 Utensia - A kingdom inhabited by animated utensils.
 Bunbury - A land where all the inhabitants are animated baked goods (like breads, buns, muffins, cakes, doughnuts, graham crackers, etc.). It is hidden in the same forest where Bunnybury is located. The trees in Bunbury are doughleanders and doughderas which produce a good crop of dough-nuts in season.
 Bunnybury - A land where intelligent and civilized rabbits walk on their hind legs and wear clothes. It is hidden in the same forest where Bunbury is located. Glinda created Bunnybury because she was fond of rabbits.
 Rigmarole Town - It is one of the Defensive Settlements of Oz. The Rigmaroles live here so they don't have to torture innocent people.
 Flutterbudget Center - It is one of the Defensive Settlements of Oz and located near the Winkie Country border in Quadling Country. All the Flutterbudgets of the Land of Oz are gathered here to protect normal citizens from their constant unfounded worrying.

The Patchwork Girl of Oz
 Mister Yoop - A captive "untamed giant."
 The Hoppers - A race of one-legged cave dwellers who travel by hopping.
 The Horners - A race of strange creatures with a single horn on their head.
 Trick River - A river that flows through Quadling Country. It flows between Winkie Country and the mountain where the Hoppers and the Horners live. The Trick River has a tendency to change its flowing directions.

The Scarecrow of Oz
 Jinxland - A monarchy separated from the rest of the Quadling Country by a gorge.
 Great Waterfall - A waterfall that is the highest in the land.

Grampa in Oz
 Ragbad - Home of King Fumbo, Queen Sew-and-Sew, and their son Prince Tatters. Its economy is based on growing textiles.

The Lost King of Oz
 Morrow - It is the home of King Pastoria's castle-type hunting lodge. Morrow is currently in disrepair when it was visited by Dorothy, the Wizard of Oz, Betsy Bobbin, Trot, and others.

Jack Pumpkinhead of Oz
 Baron Lands - A section of rolling valleys and hills in Quadling Country that are ruled over by the Barons who are independent from Glinda and Princess Ozma.
 Bourne - A location in the Baron Lands that is the home of Baron Belfaygor.
 Baffleburg - A location in the Baron Lands that strikes terror in the other areas of the Baron Lands. Mogodore the Mighty ruled Baffleburg. When Mogodore's plot was thwarted, he and his men were reduced to their true form of the Reddies and Mogodore was also shrunk to their size as well.
 Chimneyville - A city where its inhabitants are made of smoke and the city is made up of chimneys.
 Soot City - A location underneath Chimneyville.
 Goody Shop - A store set up in the northern part of Quadling Country. Its shopkeeper is an old woman that sells "good" items like Good Advice, Good Manners, and Good Days and does not accept money while also thinks that buy also means "bye."
 Scare City - A walled city in the northern part of Quadling Country. It is inhabited by the Scares, a race of grotesque beings.
 Swing City - A city that consists of nets and trapezes.

Appearances in modern works
In Gregory Maguire's revisionist Oz novels Wicked: The Life and Times of the Wicked Witch of the West and Son of a Witch, Quadling Country is described as a largely undeveloped, swampy region, with the ruddy-faced Quadlings being portrayed as artistic and sexually free. It is also stated that in Oz they represent the lowest of the low in humans. This province is located directly south, the Yellow Brick Road breaks into the mountains of the Quadling Kells to end in the capital, Qhoyre, a city made of red stones and high balconies, with its red-skinned inhabitants living in hot rooms invaded by wild insects and drinking the native drink: red mint tea; The quadlings themselves describe their homeland as "poor but incredibly beautiful", a river, Waterslip, runs along a short dry red brick road, connecting Qhoyre with Ovvels, a village hanging on the trees, just above the humid marshes and swamps, hiding underwater rubies and an exotic wildlife. Here is where Elphaba (the Wicked Witch of the West), Nessarose (the Wicked Witch of the East) and Shell are raised, though they are natives of Munchkinland. Despite its unprofitable swampy soil, Quadling Country is reported to be situated above vast deposits of rubies, and for this reason the Wizard sends his forces to clear the area for mining. This campaign results in the decimation of both the population and the ecosystem of the area.

In Oz: The Great and Powerful, the Quadlings are inhabitants of Glinda's kingdom. They are kind-hearted, simple country folk who are mostly farmers with no fighting experience. Nonetheless, they joined Glinda's army against the Wicked Witch of the East. They display little preference for the color red. Part of the Dainty China Country also appears, having been ravaged by the Wicked Witch of the East's winged baboons with China Girl as the sole survivor.

References

Fictional elements introduced in 1900
Oz countries